The Zvezda M503 (built at AO Zvezda at St Petersburg) is a maritime 7 bank, 42 cylinder diesel radial engine built in the 1970s by the Soviet Union. Its primary use was in Soviet missile boats that used three of these engines.

This engine may have had other applications, but due to its extreme weight, it would have been limited to ground or naval applications.

A German tractor pulling team designed a vehicle, named "Dragon Fire", around a methanol-fueled version of this engine; this modified engine is said to weigh  including the gearbox, for use in the 4.5 ton tractor pulling class, making  at 2,500 rpm.

Specifications (Zvezda M503A)

Zvezda engines
 AO Zvezda
 Zvezda M503 , M533 , M520 B
 Zvezda M504 56 cylinders
 Zvezda M401 V12 marine turbodiesel engine
 Zvezda M150 Pulsar V12 800 kW < 1,8 - 3 MW
 ZE1600KZ ZE Energetika 4,8 MW V8 V12 < 3 - 5 or 7 MW
 Zvezda M507 2 × 56 = 112 cylinders
 Zvezda M501
 KMZ RD production
 ADG1000 ADG6000 , 68B 68G , 85D 86B 86G at KMZ - RD and UDMZ
 TM-300 inline 6 (460 hp 200 350 kW)  or 8
 various V12 V16 and V18 from 3 5 MW 58D/A/E up to 8 9 MW 
 68B , 68G , 85D 86B 86G 8,8 MW V18

Comparable engines 
 Napier Deltic

References

 

42-cylinder engines
Marine diesel engines
Radial diesel engines
Diesel engines by model
Inline radial engines
Water-cooled radial engines